Anna Nieto-Gomez (also rendered as NietoGomez) is a scholar, journalist, and author who was a central part of the early Chicana movement. She founded the feminist journal, Encuentro Femenil, in which she and other Chicana writers addressed issues affecting the Latina community, such as childcare, reproductive rights, and the feminization of poverty.

Early life 
Anna NietoGomez was born in San Bernardino, California on March 30, 1946, the eldest of three. NietoGomez is a third-generation Chicana on the maternal side of her family while having roots in New Mexico back to the 1600s on her father's side of the family. Her mother, a high school graduate, began working for the Santa Fe Railroad at the age of eighteen in 1944. NietoGomez learned the value of independence from her father, a man who grew up witnessing his single mother struggle to raise him. Her father, a World War II veteran, taught NietoGomez how to cook and sew since he believed a woman should be able to survive on their own.

From an early age, NietoGomez was very aware of the discrimination, both from racism and sexism, that existed in her segregated community. Much of this early awareness stemmed from her own family. For example, as a young girl NietoGomez disliked how her grandfather treated her grandmother; she went on a meal strike in order to negotiate a behavior change from him. According to NietoGomez, "my grandma would not eat at that table until everyone was finished-like a servant, like she wasn't family-so that didn't seem right since neither my father nor my other grandfather treated their wives this way."

College years 
In 1967, NietoGomez began attending California State University at Long Beach and became involved in the Mexican-American students rights movement, founding Hijas de Cuauhtémoc in 1971, a feminist-centered Chicana newspaper. NietoGomez and the women's group, also named Hijas de Cuauhtémoc, "took their name from a Mexican feminist organization that worked against the Porfirio Díaz dictatorship in Mexico," and also addressed issues ignored by the Chicano population, including those to do with gender and sexuality. Her contemporaries in the group included Adelaida Del Castillo, Sylvia Castillo, Leticia Hernandez, and Corinne Sanchez.

During this time NietoGomez was also involved in el Movimiento Estudiantil Chicano de Aztlán,(MEChA). Much of NietoGomez’s activism was met with resistance from male Chicano activists who felt Chicana feminist groups were either trivial or harmful to the broader movement. Though she was elected to president of the student organization, she was hung in effigy by male students who felt a woman should not represent their organization. Male Chicano activists also commonly tried to delegitimize Chicana feminists by comparing them to white American feminists. Nieto-Gomez called those comparisons “divisive and threatening to the strength of the movement.”

Career 
Later NietoGomez would serve at California State University, Northridge, in the Department of Chicano Studies, where she challenged sexism directly through the Chicano studies classes she taught. While at Cal-State Northridge, NietoGomez created the curriculum for critical Chicana studies courses on the topics of family, global identity, history, and contemporary issues. In the Spring of 1973, Hijas de Cuauhtémoc developed into Encuentro Femenil, considered the first Chicana scholarly journal.  Encuentro Femenil published poetry and articles based on issues affecting the Chicana community, though publication stopped within two years. Her publication record also included 16 articles, many now classic works on Chicana feminism.

NietoGomez was denied tenure at California State University, Northridge in 1976, due to what she considered her political stance. After a lengthy battle to appeal the tenure decision, NietoGomez resigned on September 3, 1976. NietoGomez's tenure battle and professorship in general demonstrate not only the power dynamics and pitfalls in white male-dominated institutions, but also within the Chicano movement of the time.

Selected works 

 Encuentro Femenil
 The Needs of the Chicano on the College Campus (1969)

References

1946 births
Living people
American women journalists
Chicana feminists
Hispanic and Latino American women journalists
People from San Bernardino County, California
Journalists from California
American people of Mexican descent
Neomexicanos
21st-century American women